The  is a zoo, owned by the government of Tokyo Metropolis, and located in Hino, Tokyo, Japan. The zoo aims to use its large site – 52 ha, compared to the 14.3 ha of the Ueno Zoo – to show its animals moving in a more free and natural environment.

Animals
Animals in the zoo include:

Insectarium
Blue glassy tiger
Common grass yellow
Flower mantis
Leafcutter ant

Asian Zone

Amur tiger
Asian black bear
Asian elephant
Bar-headed goose
Black-faced spoonbill
Bornean orangutan
Eurasian eagle-owl
Eurasian otter
Golden eagle
Golden takin
Grey wolf
Himalayan tahr
Indian rhinoceros
Japanese badger
Japanese giant flying squirrel
Japanese hare
Japanese macaque
Japanese serow
Lar gibbon
Malayan tapir
Masked palm civet
Mouflon
Oriental stork
Père David's deer
Pheasant pigeon
Przewalski's horse
Steller's sea eagle
Red-crowned crane
Red panda
Reindeer
Siberian crane
Snow leopard
Straw-necked ibis
Tanuki
Water buffalo
White-tailed eagle

Mole House
A man-made mole burrow made of glass-covered earth and metal tunnels, housing Japanese moles and small Japanese moles.

African Zone
African bush elephant
Chimpanzee
Greater flamingo
Great white pelican
Grévy's zebra
Lion
Reticulated giraffe
Scimitar oryx
Serval

Australian Zone
Common brushtail possum
Common wallaroo
Emu
Koala
Laughing kookaburra
Parma wallaby
Red kangaroo
Tasmanian devil
Yellow-footed rock wallaby

Access
Tama-Dōbutsukōen Station on the Keiō Dōbutsuen Line and the Tama Toshi Monorail Line is in front of the park's gate.

References

External links

 Official site (English)
 Official site (Japanese)

Zoos in Japan
Greater Tokyo Area
Tourist attractions in Tokyo
1958 establishments in Japan
Zoos established in 1958
Hino, Tokyo
Postmodern architecture in Japan